Hazel Anne Marie Manning is a former Trinidad and Tobago politician. She entered the Senate as a People's National Movement Senator after the 2001 general election. Senator Manning served as Minister of Education of Trinidad and Tobago and subsequently as Minister of Local Government. She is also the widow of former Prime Minister Patrick Manning.

She was born in the southern city of San Fernando and received her secondary education at St. Joseph's Convent, San Fernando. She obtained her bachelor's degree from the University of the West Indies at St. Augustine in the social sciences. She subsequently obtained a postgraduate diploma in administration. She and Patrick Manning were married in 1972. They have two sons, Brian and David.

Her career has included working in various agencies, including the Town and Country Planning Division of the Ministry of Planning and Development, where she was head of its research unit. She also worked for several years as a social impact assessment consultant.

References

Year of birth missing (living people)
Living people
Members of the Senate (Trinidad and Tobago)
Ministers of Education of Trinidad and Tobago
Government ministers of Trinidad and Tobago
Spouses of prime ministers of Trinidad and Tobago
People from San Fernando, Trinidad and Tobago
People's National Movement politicians
Women government ministers of Trinidad and Tobago
21st-century Trinidad and Tobago women politicians
21st-century Trinidad and Tobago politicians
Trinidad and Tobago people of American descent
University of the West Indies alumni